The Second Milestone is an album by tenor saxophonist Eric Alexander. It was recorded in 2000 and released by Milestone Records.

Recording and music
The album was recorded in December 2000. Most of the tracks are played by the quartet of tenor saxophonist Eric Alexander, pianist Harold Mabern, bassist Peter Washington, and drummer Joe Farnsworth. Trumpeter Jim Rotondi plays on three tracks. "The Man from Hyde Park" is a reworking of "The Song Is You"; "Luna Naranja" is a samba.

Release and reception

The Second Milestone was released by Milestone Records. The AllMusic reviewer concluded: "This very impressive date is highly recommended."

Track listing
"Matchmaker, Matchmaker" – 8:51
"The Second Milestone" – 6:05
"Moment to Moment" – 7:08
"The Man from Hyde Park" – 7:04
"Estate" – 7:42
"Luna Naranja" – 7:11
"John Neely Beautiful People" – 8:01
"The Cliffs of Asturias" – 6:21

Personnel
Eric Alexander – tenor saxophone
Jim Rotondi – trumpet
Harold Mabern – piano
Peter Washington – bass
Joe Farnsworth – drums

References

2001 albums
Eric Alexander (jazz saxophonist) albums
Albums recorded at Van Gelder Studio
Milestone Records albums